The 2008 Alaska Democratic presidential caucuses took place Super Tuesday, February 5, 2008. This was the first time that Democrats in Alaska participated in Super Tuesday, and the large turnout forced at least one caucusing site to delay closing its doors far beyond the 6 p.m. deadline. The state had a total of 13 delegates at stake. Barack Obama won the Alaska Democratic Caucuses and secured 9 delegates to the Democratic National Convention while Hillary Clinton took 4 delegates. However, the caucus was non-binding, and Alaska's Democratic State Convention in May awarded Obama 10 pledged delegates.

Process
The Alaska Democratic Caucuses were open to all Alaska voters. Non-Democrats and unregistered voters could register or switch party affiliation at the meeting. At the caucus, voters "fanned out" to groups of supporters of their candidate. Then delegates to the state convention on May 24, 2008, were selected from these preference groups. At the district caucuses, candidates required a minimum support threshold of 15 percent to win delegates to the state convention. The same threshold applied at the state convention; candidates needed a support threshold of 15 percent to receive delegates at the Democratic National Convention.

However, the district caucus results were not binding on the state convention delegates. Therefore, although Obama only won 9 delegate votes in the caucuses, at the state convention he secured 10.  Unlike many caucus states, the actual number of votes in the Alaska caucuses was disclosed. Many states only tabulate state delegates or state delegate equivalents.

The state convention officially allocated the 13 delegates to the national convention. In addition, the state convention chose five superdelegates to attend the national convention. Superdelegates officially were not pledged to any candidate. However, all of Alaska's superdelegates endorsed either Clinton or Obama.

Results

State Convention 

Superdelegates

Analysis 
Barack Obama scored a major victory in the Democratic Caucuses, winning by more than a three-to-one margin over Hillary Clinton.

See also
2008 Alaska Republican presidential caucuses

References

See also

Democratic caucuses
Alaska
2008
2008 Super Tuesday